Klara Amalie Skoglund (22 September 1891 – 8 May 1978) was a Norwegian politician for the Labour Party.

She was born in Oslo.

She was elected to the Norwegian Parliament from Østfold in 1945, and was re-elected on two occasions. She had previously served in the position of deputy representative during the term 1937–1945.

References

1891 births
1978 deaths
Labour Party (Norway) politicians
Members of the Storting
Women members of the Storting
20th-century Norwegian women politicians
20th-century Norwegian politicians